K11UU-D (channel 11) is a low-power independent television station in Pago Pago, American Samoa, owned by American Samoa Adventist Media Ministry, Inc.

History
Pacific Channel Samoa (PCS TV), a company owned by Bill Hyman, received a construction permit to build a new channel 11 low-power television station at Pago Pago on January 18, 2002; the station filed for a license to cover on October 14, 2003. Pacific Channel Samoa transferred the license to co-owned Samoa Systems, Inc. in 2010. PCS-TV converted to digital that same year; at that time, it broadcast Australia Network most of the day, live sports from New Zealand and Fiji, and religious programs on the Baháʼí Faith.

Hyman's finances suffered after he lost money making a movie in the early 2010s, prompting him to consider selling the television station. In August 2016, Hyman sold K11UU-D to a Seventh-Day Adventist media group, which he had selected to purchase the station, since it would continue to air religious fare. PCS programming moved to the 11.2 subchannel, and channel 11.1 relaunched as a local outlet under the Hope Channel banner.

Subchannels
The station's digital signal is multiplexed:

See also
Communications in American Samoa

References

External links
 PCS TV on Facebook

11UU-D
Television channels and stations established in 2003
2003 establishments in American Samoa
Low-power television stations in the United States
Religious television stations in the United States
Religious organizations based in American Samoa
Seventh-day Adventist media
Seventh-day Adventist Church in Oceania